Fabri-Kal  is a United States company. It is a provider of plastic foodservice and custom thermoformed packaging. Products include consumer and foodservice products including plastic cups, containers and lids. It is privately owned. It is headquartered in Kalamazoo, Michigan. Fabri-Kal specializes in materials including PP, PET, PCR-PET, HDPE, PLA, renewable agricultural pulp and HIPS.

Company history
Fabri-Kal Corporation was founded in Kalamazoo, Michigan in 1950 when seven investors purchased the plastic segment of the Kalamazoo Paper Box Company. The owners decided to call the new business Fabri-Kal, a portmanteau of "fabricated in Kalamazoo".

Located in downtown Kalamazoo, their initial 5,000 square foot operation began in a former A&P grocery store. The company built a 25,000 square foot manufacturing facility on East Cork Street in Kalamazoo, which was followed in 1961 by a second manufacturing facility in Hazleton, Pennsylvania.

As the company continued to grow, the Fabri-Kal Foundation was established in 1969 to provide higher-education tuition assistance to young-adult children of all employees. In 1981 a new headquarters building was constructed in Kalamazoo and a third manufacturing facility opened in Piedmont, South Carolina.

In 1991 the Kalamazoo manufacturing facility closed its doors, leaving all manufacturing capacity outside of Michigan. The company was able to overcome its hardships and purchased a 400,000 square foot building in 2008 and after a two year renovation once again opened their doors. In 2010 the Kalamazoo manufacturing facility was awarded the LEED® Silver certification.

On October 15, 2015, Fabri-Kal held the grand opening for their new 100,000 square foot manufacturing facility in Burley, Idaho employing approximately 50 people with an additional 100 people planned in the next five years.

On September 8, 2021 it was announced Pactiv will acquire the company, through its wholly-owned subsidiary Pactiv Evergreen Group Holdings, for $380 million.

Product lines
 Greenware cold drink cups and portion cups
 Kal-Clear PET drink cups
 Nexclear polypropylene drink cups
 RK translucent drink cups 
 Kids cups
 Juice cups
 Portion cups
 Alur round containers
 Indulge dessert containers
 Pro-Kal deli containers 
 Microwavable bowls
 Mushroom tills
 Produce clamshells
 Lids

Greenware
Fabri-Kal produces sustainable Greenware cold drink cups, lids and portion cups made entirely from plants, not petroleum. All Greenware products are 100% made in the U.S.A.

References

Companies based in Kalamazoo, Michigan
Bioplastics
1950 establishments in Michigan
American companies established in 1950